Haplomacrourus nudirostris, the naked snout rattail, is a benthic species of rattail found in the southern oceans where it occurs on the continental slopes at depths of from   This species grows to a length of  TL. It is the only species in the genus Haplomacrourus.

References
 

Macrouridae
Monotypic ray-finned fish genera